Round nose may refer to:

 NOHAB Bulldog, a diesel locomotive
 A type of bullet
 A hemispherical diabolo pellet for an air gun
 The 701 model Yahama SuperJet personal watercraft